José Francisco Belman González (born 16 June 1971) is a Spanish former professional footballer who played as a goalkeeper. He is the current goalkeeping coach of Brazilian club Red Bull Bragantino.

Playing career
Belman was born in Málaga, Andalusia. After playing in his early years with former denominations of Málaga CF he went on to represent Real Balompédica Linense, Real Zaragoza (with a stint in its B team), Real Valladolid, Hércules CF and C.D. Nacional. He was mostly used as a backup; for example, 30 of his 38 games with his last club came in his first season, when he helped the Madeirans promote to the Portuguese Primeira Liga. 

Belman's best input in La Liga consisted of 11 appearances with Zaragoza in 1995–96, where he conceded 16 goals. He also featured in two UEFA Cup Winners' Cup matches in that campaign with the Aragonese, the 2–1 quarter-final aggregate loss against fellow Spaniards Deportivo de La Coruña.

Coaching career
Shortly after retiring at the age of 37, Belman began working as a goalkeeper coach. After two years with Real Madrid's under-19 he returned to his main club Nacional in 2010, leaving abruptly in late 2012 to join Santos Laguna. 

Belman signed with Scottish side Rangers in March 2017, to work under Pedro Caixinha in the same capacity. On 26 October of that year, both left Ibrox Stadium.

Personal life
Belman's son, Javier, was also a footballer and a goalkeeper. He was groomed at Real Madrid.

References

External links

1971 births
Living people
Spanish footballers
Footballers from Málaga
Association football goalkeepers
La Liga players
Segunda División players
Segunda División B players
Tercera División players
CD Málaga footballers
Deportivo Fabril players
Real Balompédica Linense footballers
Real Zaragoza B players
Real Zaragoza players
Real Valladolid players
Hércules CF players
Primeira Liga players
Liga Portugal 2 players
C.D. Nacional players
Spain youth international footballers
Spanish expatriate footballers
Expatriate footballers in Portugal
Spanish expatriate sportspeople in Portugal
Spanish expatriate sportspeople in Mexico
Spanish expatriate sportspeople in Qatar
Spanish expatriate sportspeople in Scotland
Rangers F.C. non-playing staff